FOF may refer to:

 Fact or Faked: Paranormal Files, an American television series
 Fear of falling
 Fight or Flight (disambiguation)
 Finding of fact
 Finnish Orienteering Federation
 Flow of funds
 Focus on the Family
 Forum of Firms, an accountancy trade organization
 Forskning och Framsteg, a Swedish popular science magazine
 Fred. Olsen Airtransport, a defunct Norwegian airline
 Frets on Fire, a video game
 Fund of funds
 Identification friend or foe
 FOF grade tea
 FOF, the SMILES notation for oxygen difluoride